American Canyon (previously known as Napa Junction) is a city located in southern Napa County, California,  northeast of San Francisco, part of the San Francisco Bay Area. The 2020 census reported the city's population as 21,837.  Its ZIP Code is 94503, and its area code is 707. It is in the Pacific Time time zone and observes Daylight-Saving Time. The city was incorporated in 1992.

Geography
American Canyon is bounded geographically by the Napa River to the west, the foothills of the Sulfur Springs Mountains to the east, Vallejo and Solano County to the south and vineyards and the Napa County Airport (IATA airport code APC) to the north. American Canyon Creek, a tributary of the Napa River, runs through the city.

The unincorporated community of Napa Junction is adjacent to the city.

Climate
This region experiences warm (but not hot) and dry summers, with no average monthly temperatures above 71.6 °F.  According to the Köppen Climate Classification system, American Canyon has a warm-summer Mediterranean climate, abbreviated "Csb" on climate maps.

Demographics
American Canyon is the second most populous city in Napa County, after the City of Napa.

2010
The 2010 United States Census reported that American Canyon had a population of 19,454. The racial makeup of American Canyon was 7,564 (38.9%) White, 1,535 (7.9%) African American, 142 (0.7%) Native American, 6,396 (32.9%) Asian, 176 (0.9%) Pacific Islander, 2,357 (12.1%) from other races, and 1,284 (6.6%) from two or more races. Hispanic or Latino of any race were 5,009 persons (25.7%).

The Census reported that 99.7% of the population lived in households and 0.3% lived in non-institutionalized group quarters.

There were 5,657 households, out of which 2,805 (49.6%) had children under the age of 18 living in them, 3,527 (62.3%) were opposite-sex married couples living together, 751 (13.3%) had a female householder with no husband present, 335 (5.9%) had a male householder with no wife present.  There were 296 (5.2%) unmarried opposite-sex partnerships, and 42 (0.7%) same-sex married couples or partnerships. 765 households (13.5%) were made up of individuals, and 309 (5.5%) had someone living alone who was 65 years of age or older. The average household size was 3.43.  There were 4,613 families (81.5% of all households); the average family size was 3.78.

The population was spread out, with 5,496 people (28.3%) under the age of 18, 1,764 people (9.1%) aged 18 to 24, 5,234 people (26.9%) aged 25 to 44, 5,095 people (26.2%) aged 45 to 64, and 1,865 people (9.6%) who were 65 years of age or older.  The median age was 35.5 years. For every 100 females, there were 96.0 males.  For every 100 females age 18 and over, there were 92.6 males.

The homeowner vacancy rate was 2.6%; the rental vacancy rate was 3.8%. 77.4% of the population lived in owner-occupied housing units and 22.4% lived in rental housing units.

2000
The 2000 census reported 9,774 people in the city, organized into 3,209 households and 2451 families.  The U. S. Census Bureau reported the population of the city as 19,454 , an increase of 99%. The city government estimated the population at 19,862 , citing statistics from the California Department of Finance Demographic Research Unit.

There were 3209 households, out of which 38.1% had children under the age of 18 living with them, 58.1% were married couples living together, 12.6% had a female householder with no husband present, and 23.6% were non-families. 18.7% of all households were made up of individuals, and 9.3% had someone living alone who was 65 years of age or older.  The average household size was 3.0 and the average family size was 3.4.
In the city, the population was spread out, with 28.4% under the age of 18, 7.6% from 18 to 24, 28.1% from 25 to 44, 22.5% from 45 to 64, and 13.4% who were 65 years of age or older.  The median age was 37 years.  For every 100 females, there were 97.1 males.  For every 100 females age 18 and over, there were 92.0 males.

The median income for a household in the city was $52,105, and the median income for a family was $61,536. Males had a median income of $42,358 versus $29,211 for females. The per capita income for the city was $18,440.  8.8% of the population and 6.8% of families were below the poverty line.  Out of the total population, 9.6% of those under the age of 18 and 10.6% of those 65 and older were living below the poverty line.

Economy
Major employers in American Canyon include Owens Corning Masonry Products and Mezzetta.

Government
The mayor of American Canyon is popularly elected to a four-year term.  The current mayor is Leon Garcia.  City Council members are elected to four-year terms, and select one of their members to serve as vice mayor.  The other current City Council members are Mariam Aboudamous, Mark Joseph, David Oro, and Kenneth Leary.  Leon Garcia is serving his fourth term as mayor, and Mark Joseph is the vice mayor.

References

External links
 
 American Canyon Chamber of Commerce website
 American Canyon Online

Cities in Napa County, California
Cities in the San Francisco Bay Area
Populated places established in 1992
1992 establishments in California
Incorporated cities and towns in California